"Yours" is the debut studio album from Australian singer-songwriter, Nathaniel Willemse. It was released in Australia on 23 October 2015 and debuted at number 5 on the ARIA Charts.

Themes
Producer David Musumeci of DNA Songs explains, "From the moment we signed Nathaniel we knew we wanted to make a record with great emotional depth that would take you on a rollercoaster ride of emotions as you run through it, and we think we've achieved that with Yours. Nathaniel is a true talent and we hope the people enjoy listening to this album as much as we loved making it."

Willemse said of the album's theme "The album covers the themes of love, relationships and break-ups, but it also covers being yourself, and being inspired and confident enough to make the right choices in life... For me, all these songs have their own particular story and sound."

Review

Marcus Floyd of Renowned for Sound gave the album 4.5 out of 5 saying, "Yours is jam packed with influences from various genres like synth-pop, funk and soul: a decent mix for a popular artist of today that's for sure." Adding "Nathaniel's vocal game is one of the strongest to grace radio, his knack for writing and delivering pop music is astounding, and his overall sound is addictive. Yours is one of the most decent debut albums brought out by a modern pop star that you'll find." Cameron Adams from The Herald Sun gave the album 3.5 out of 5 and said the album was "solid". He added this is "how to do commercial soul with style".

Jackie Smith of CargoArt said, "Yours [is] a collection of upbeat, radio-ready tracks set to hook many a listener. I dare you not to sing along to this collection of earworms." Smith's favourites include "Always Be Yours" and "Don't Let A Good Thing Go". Smith said these tracks show "Nathaniel's impressive vocal range and have a lyrical quality that will appeal to those who have a weakness for a heartfelt song".

Track listing

Charts

Release history

References

2015 debut albums
Sony Music Australia albums
Albums produced by DNA Songs